The following is a list of characters that first appeared in the Channel 4 soap opera Hollyoaks in 2004, in order of first appearance.

Rachel Osborne

Rachel Osborne is a fictional character from the long-running Channel 4 soap opera Hollyoaks, played by Lucy Evans. She joined the show in 2004 before leaving later that year. Her sister Natalie Osborne was horrified when Rachel arrived and vowed to get rid of her as soon as possible. After weeks of fighting and squabbling, the final straw came when her uncle Jack Osborne found out about her failing her exams due to the lack of work and also her second pregnancy but not knowing who the father was. Despite using her charms, Jack told Rachel and Natalie that they were being sent home. Rachel was delighted, and both left, going back to Scotland.

Candy Browne

Candy Browne is a fictional character from the long-running Channel 4 soap opera Hollyoaks, played by Laura Handley. The character was written out in 2005. Candy was friends with Nicole Owen and Candy encouraged Nicole to send in images of herself to a modelling agency, only to be told that her breasts were too small. Nicole then wanted to get implants and asked Candy to pretend she invited Nicole on holiday with her and her family. Nicole did not go through with the operation and her mum eventually found out what she had planned to do. The following Christmas the two girls went carol singing for money and when they returned to school they made friends with new girl Paula Johnson. Paula tried to break up the two friends. Candy left after a blazing row with Nicole following stirring by Paula. Candy brought up Nicole's brother Sam Owen and his conviction for arson calling him a "kiddy murderer". Nicole never forgave her for this and Candy was never seen again.

Bella Manning

Bella Manning is a fictional character on the long-running Channel 4 British television soap opera Hollyoaks. She was played by actress Kim Bourelle and appeared between 2004 and 2005.

Harry Fox

Harry is a reporter at the Chester Herald. He was last seen covering the naked protest Olivia Johnson and Jessica Harris held at Il Gnosh.

Dannii Carbone

Stacey Foxx

Stacey Foxx first appeared when she had a one-night stand of Kristian Hargreaves, who later used her to make his girlfriend Dannii Carbone jealous. Stacey became obsessed with him Kristian, who learned that she was working with Dannii to teach him a lesson for his poor treatment of women. Stacey next appeared some time later when she lost her salon job and started up Foxx & Hunter's Health Haven, a short-lived makeshift salon in the Hunter household with fellow beauty student Lee Hunter. Stacey began to have feelings for him and one day, decided to seduce him using whipped cream, however his mother Sally showed up and assumed she was using their home for escorting. Lee was too confused to defend Stacey and she stormed out of the house. Stacey and Lee left for a few months to work at a health spa but Lee was kicked out after taking the blame for Stacey making a mistake with Liz Burton's treatment. Stacey chose to stay at the spa instead of resuming her partnership with Lee.

Russ Owen

Carrie Owen

Nicole Owen

Sam Owen

Samuel Liam "Sam" Owen was killed off in the famous fire at The Dog. He died with: Olivia Johnson, Joe Spencer, Sophie Burton and Mel Burton. He was one of Hollyoaks' most memorable villains.

Callum

Callum was a friend and colleague of Ben Davies. Callum moved in with Ben and his girlfriend Lisa Hunter and tried to help Ben get over his fear of fire and return to his job as a firefighter. After Ben decides to quit his job, Callum threw a party. He made his final appearance in August 2005.

Zak Ramsey

Stuart Harding

Stuart Harding was an American fitness instructor who resided the village between 2004 and 2005.

Michelle Dean

Michelle Dean was a seven-months pregnant 19-year-old student first seen in November 2004 as a mysterious character in the background of Johnno Dean. It was revealed that after Johnno became alienated from his wife Frankie Dean while suffering from a midlife crisis caused by the collapse of his workplace several months earlier, he had a drunken fling with Michelle which, while only intended as a one-off, developed into an affair after Michelle discovered that she was pregnant with Johnno's baby. Frankie immediately filed for a divorce, and Johnno and Michelle left Hollyoaks soon after, getting married in July 2005 after Johnno's divorce from Frankie was finalised. They briefly returned to Hollyoaks in July 2005, at which time it was revealed that Michelle had given birth to a son, named Presley. Steph went to see on her wedding day to her father and visiting them and Presley. Steph later told her mother that she and Michelle get along together.

In 2015, Frankie went to visit her and Johnno. In 2017, when Johnno arrives at the village, he mentioned to Frankie that he was no longer with Michelle, and Presley was living with him, although the circumstances behind this were not  explained.

References

External links
 Bella Manning at Hollyoaks.com

, Hollyoaks
2004